Samuel Thompson Chase (September 14, 1868 – May 9, 1937) was an American tennis player active in the late 19th century.

Tennis career
Chase reached the semifinals of the U.S. National Championships in 1893 and the quarterfinals in 1892.

External links 

1868 births
1937 deaths
American male tennis players
Tennis players from Chicago